The Rock in Japan Festival is an annual three-day rock festival held during early August at the Hitachi Seaside Park, in Hitachinaka, Ibaraki, Japan, organized by Rockin'on. Rock in Japan Festival is the biggest rock festival in Japan in terms of attendance.

Performances

2012

2013

External links 

Summer festivals
Rock festivals in Japan
Recurring events established in 2000
Tourist attractions in Ibaraki Prefecture